This is a list of Scottish football transfers featuring at least one 2016–17 Scottish Premiership club or one 2016–17 Scottish Championship club which were completed during the summer 2016 transfer window. The window closed at midnight on 31 August 2016.

List

See also
 List of Scottish football transfers winter 2015–16
 List of Scottish football transfers winter 2016–17

References

External links
Scottish Premiership ins and outs - summer 2016, BBC Sport
Scottish Championship ins and outs - summer 2016, BBC Sport

Transfers
Scottish
2016 in Scottish sport
2016 summer